Nauksham Chaudhary is an Indian politician from Bharatiya Janata Party.

Personal life 
Nauksham Chaudhary was born in 1993 into a Dalit family. Her father Ram Kumar Chaudhary, is a retired judge and a Hindu by religion and her mother, Ranjit Kaur is a bureaucrat and a Sikh by religion. Also she grew up in Chandigarh and lived in Delhi.

She did B.A from Delhi University and M.A in Modern Indian History from Miranda House, M.A in the Luxury Brand Management from Istituto Marangoni at Milan in Italy and M.A in Media and Communications from London, England.

Political career 
She joined Bharatiya Janata Party after returning to India and was nominated as a party candidate from the Punahana constituency in the 2019 Haryana Legislative Assembly elections. But she lost to Md. Ilyas of INC, also a three-times MLA.

She is also a lead in pro-CAA campaign in Haryana.

References 

1993 births
Bharatiya Janata Party politicians from Haryana
Living people
People from Nuh district
Delhi University alumni